Ren Hongqiang (born May 1964) is a Chinese environmentalist currently serving as dean of the School of the Environment of Nanjing University.

Biography
Ren was born in Zhuozhou, Hebei, in May 1964. In 1990 he graduated from Hebei University of Science and Technology. He earned his master's degree in thermal power from North China Electric Power University in 1997 and his doctor's degree in fermentation engineering from Jiangnan University in 2000, respectively. He was a postdoctoral fellow at Nanjing University between 2001 and 2002. In 2003 he became a professor and doctoral supervisor at Nanjing University.

Honours and awards
 2012 "Chang Jiang Scholar" (or " Yangtze River Scholar")
 2014 Science and Technology Progress Award of the Ho Leung Ho Lee Foundation 
 November 22, 2019 Member of the Chinese Academy of Engineering (CAE)

References

1964 births
Living people
People from Zhuozhou
Engineers from Hebei
Chinese environmentalists
Hebei University of Science and Technology alumni
North China Electric Power University alumni
Jiangnan University alumni
Academic staff of Nanjing University
Members of the Chinese Academy of Engineering
Educators from Hebei